Scopula grasuta is a moth of the  family Geometridae. It is found in Mexico and Guatemala.

References

Moths described in 1901
grasuta
Moths of Central America